The Society for Acupuncture Research is a Winston–Salem, North Carolina–based medical society dedicated to advancing research into acupuncture and related interventions. It was founded in 1993 by Patricia Culliton, Hannah Bradford, and Stephen Birch, and was originally based in Bethesda, Maryland. Its current co-presidents are Vitaly Napadow and Robert Davis.

See also
The Journal of Alternative and Complementary Medicine

References

External links

Organizations established in 1993
Acupuncture organizations
Medical associations based in the United States
1993 establishments in Maryland
Organizations based in Winston-Salem, North Carolina